Fidel de Luca (29 April 1922 – 6 June 2007) was an Argentine professional golfer. Born in San Isidro, Buenos Aires, he worked as a caddie in Buenos Aires, before turning professional in 1948.

De Luca  won the Argentine Professional Ranking nine times, but only competed in three major championships, appearing twice in the British Open, in 1958 and 1960, and once in the Masters Tournament in 1962. In 1958, on the European circuit, he won the German Open, and finished fourth in French Open.

De Luca represented Argentina on nine occasions in the World Cup, with a best finish of second place in partnership with Roberto De Vicenzo in the 1962 edition, which was held on home soil at the Jockey Club in Buenos Aires.

Professional wins (51)

European wins (1)
 1958 German Open

Argentine wins (43)
 1952 Alvear Grand Prix
 1954 Argentine Open
 1956 Argentino Grand Prix, Western Textil Grand Prix (tie with Romulado Barbieri and Antonio Cerdá)
 1957 Olivos Grand Prix
 1958 Center Open
 1959 Abierto del Litoral, Rio Cuarto Open
 1960 Argentine Open, Abierto del Litoral
 1961 Argentine Open, Abierto del Litoral, Acantilados Grand Prix
 1962 Argentine PGA Championship, Abierto del Litoral
 1963 Argentine PGA Championship, South Open
 1964 Juan Dentone Cup
 1965 North Open
 1966 Abierto del Litoral
 1967 Juan Dentone Cup
 1968 Center Open, Argentine PGA Championship, La Cumbre Open
 1969 Abierto del Litoral
 1970 Jockey Club Rosario Open, Metropolitano Open
 1971 Abierto del Litoral, North Open, Jujuy Open, Chaco Open
 1972 Argentine Open, Norpatagonico Open, Ituzaingo Grand Prix, San Martin Grand Prix
 1973 Argentine PGA Championship, Jujuy Open
 1974 South Open, Abierto del Litoral, Ituzaingo Grand Prix
 1976 Mendoza Open, Jockey Club Rosario Open
 1982 Argentine PGA Championship

Other wins (7)
 1955 Peru Open
 1956 Brazil Open
 1965 Ecuador Open
 1970 Petropolis Open (Brazil)
 1974 Peru Open
 1979 Brazil Open
 1990 Argentine Senior PGA Championship

Team appearances
 World Cup (representing Argentina): 1958, 1959, 1960, 1961, 1962, 1963, 1967, 1973, 1974

Argentine male golfers
Sportspeople from Buenos Aires
People from San Isidro, Buenos Aires
1922 births
2007 deaths